Tome Jail is a historic jail building in Tome, New Mexico. It is the only surviving part of the former Valencia County Courthouse, built when the county seat was moved from Belen to Tome in 1875. The courthouse was a two-story adobe building which gradually disappeared due to erosion, but the jail had more durable stone walls and remained standing. Construction of the building was probably authorized by Probate Judge Manuel A. Otero, who was the chief county official at the time and whose name appears in a bilingual inscription carved into the stone lintel.

It has small windows on the south and west sides, each with a double set of bars set into a wooden frame on the inside and a sandstone frame on the outside. The interior walls and roof are of rough-cut lumber.

References

National Register of Historic Places in Valencia County, New Mexico
Jails on the National Register of Historic Places in New Mexico
Government buildings completed in 1875